Docodonta is an order of extinct mammaliaforms that lived during the Mesozoic, from the Middle Jurassic to Early Cretaceous. They are distinguished from other early mammaliaforms by their relatively complex molar teeth, from which the order gets its name.  Until recently, Docodonta were represented primarily by teeth and jaws found across former Laurasia, (modern-day North America, Europe, and Asia). However, recent discoveries in China include some exceptionally well preserved, almost complete body fossils.

Description

Skeletal traits 
Docodonts have a long and low mandible (lower jaw), formed primarily by the tooth-bearing dentary bone. The dentary connects to the cranium via a joint with the squamosal, a connection which is strengthened relative to earlier mammaliaforms. The other bones in the jaw, known as postdentary elements, are still connected to the dentary and lie within a groove (the postdentary trough) in the rear part of the dentary's inner edge. Nevertheless, they are very slender, hosting hooked prongs which start to converge towards an oval-shaped area immediately behind the dentary. The ecotympanic bone, also known as the angular, fits into a deep slot on the dentary which opens backwards, a characteristic unique to docodonts. The malleus (also known as the articular) sends down a particularly well-developed prong known as the manubrium, which is sensitive to vibrations. The incus (also known as the quadrate) is still relatively large and rests against the petrosal bone of the braincase, a remnant of a pre-mammalian style jaw joint. In true mammals, the postdentary elements detach fully and shrink further, becoming the ossicles of the middle ear and embracing a circular eardrum.
Docodont skulls are generally fairly low, and in general form are similar to other early mammliaforms such as morganucodonts. The snout is long and has several plesiomorphic traits: the paired nares (nostril holes) are small and separate, and their rear edge is formed by a large septomaxilla, a bone which is no longer present in mammals. The nasal bones expand at the back and overlook thick lacrimals. The frontal and parietal bones of the skull roof are flat and broad, and there is no postorbital process forming the rear rim of the orbit (eye socket).

The oldest unambiguous fossil evidence of hair is found in a well-preserved specimen of the docodont Castorocauda, though hair likely evolved much earlier in synapsids. Docodonts also see the first occurrence of a mammalian-style saddle-shaped hyoid complex. Microdocodon has a straight, sideways-oriented basihyal which connects to two pairs of bony structures: the anterior hyoid cornu (a jointed series of rods which snake up to the braincase), and the posterior thyrohyals (which link to the thyroid cartilage). This hyoid system affords greater strength and flexibility than the simple, U-shaped hyoids of earlier cynodonts. It allows for a narrower and more muscular throat and tongue, which are correlated with uniquely mammalian behaviors such as suckling.

The structure of the vertebral column is variable between docodonts, as with many other mammaliaforms. The components of the atlas are unfused, attaching to the large and porous occipital condyles of the braincase. Vertebrae at the base of the tail often have expanded transverse processes (rib pedestals), supporting powerful tail musculature. Most docodonts have gradually shrinking ribs, forming a subdued transition between the thoracic and lumbar regions of the spine. However, this developmental trait is not universal: Agilodocodon lacks lumbar ribs, for example. The forelimbs and hindlimbs generally have strong muscle attachments, and the olecranon process of the ulna is flexed inwards. All limb bones except the tibia lack epiphyses, plate-like ossified cartilage caps which terminate bone growth in adulthood. This suggests that docodont bones continued growing throughout their lifetime, like some other mammaliaforms and early mammals. The ankle is distinctive, with a downturned calcaneum and a stout astragalus which connects to the tibia via a trochlea (pulley-like joint). The only known specimen of Castorocauda has a pointed spur on its ankle, similar to defensive structures observed in male monotremes and several other early-branching mammals.

Teeth 

Compared to other early mammaliaforms, docodont molars are quite complex. Their structure is defined by a characteristic pattern of conical cusps, with sharp, concave crests connecting the center of each cusp to adjacent cusps. When seen from below, the upper molars have an overall subtriangular or figure-eight shape, wider (from side to side) than they are long (from front to back). The bulk of the tooth makes up four major cusps: cusps A, C, X, and Y. This overall structure is similar to the tribosphenic teeth found in true therian mammals, like modern marsupials and placentals. However, homologizing docodont cusps to those of modern mammals has been a controversial and heavily-debated topic. Cusps A and C lie in a row along the labial edge of the tooth (i.e., on the outer side, facing the cheek). Cusp A is located in front of cusp C and is typically the largest cusp in the upper molars. Cusp X lies lingual to cusp A (i.e., positioned inwards, towards the midline of the skull). A distinct wear facet is found on the labial edge of cusp X, extending along the crest leading to cusp A. Cusp Y, a unique feature of docodonts, is positioned directly behind cusp X. Many docodonts have one or two additional cusps (cusps B and E) in front of cusp A. Cusp B is almost always present and is usually shifted slightly labial relative to cusp A. Cusp E, which may be absent in later docodonts, is positioned lingual to cusp B.

The lower molars are longer than wide. On average, they have seven cusps arranged in two rows. The labial/outer row has the largest cusp, cusp a, which lies between two more cusps. The other major labial cusps are cusp b (a slightly smaller cusp in front of cusp a) and cusp d (a much smaller cusp behind cusp a). The lingual/inner row is shifted backwards (relative to the labial row) and has two large cusps: cusp g (at the front) and cusp c (at the back). Two additional lingual cusps may be present: cusp e and cusp df. Cusp e lies in front of cusp g and is roughly lingual to cusp b. Cusp df (“docodont cuspule f”) lies behind cusp c and is lingual to cusp d. There is some variation in the relative sizes, position, or even presence of some of these cusps, though docodonts in general have a fairly consistent cusp pattern.

A distinct basin, known as a pseudotalonid, lies in the front part of the tooth, between cusps a, g, and b. When the upper and lower teeth occlude (fit together), the pseudotalonid acts as a receptacle for cusp Y of the upper molar, which may be termed the "pseudoprotocone". At the same time, cusp b of the lower molar shears into an area labial to cusp Y. Occlusion is completed when the rest of the upper molar slides between adjacent lower molar teeth, letting the rear edge of the preceding lower molar scrape against cusp X. This shearing-and-grinding process is more specialized than in any other early mammaliaform. An interlocking pseudotalonid and pseudoprotocone system references the talonid-and-protocone crushing complex of therian mammals, though this is a case of convergent evolution, as therian talonids lie at the back of the lower molar rather than the front. Docodont teeth can be considered "pseudotribosphenic" in this regard. Pseudotribosphenic teeth are also found in shuotheriids and australophenidans, though these groups have a pseudotalonid which is positioned further forwards in their lower molars. This is another case of convergent evolution, as skeletal material has revealed that shuotheriids and australosphenidans are true mammals related to modern monotremes. Docodont and shuotheriid teeth are so similar that some genera, namely Itatodon and Paritatodon, have been considered members of either group.

Paleoecology 

Docodonts and other Mesozoic mammals were traditionally thought to have been primarily ground dwelling and insectivorous, but recent more complete fossils from China have shown this is not the case. Castorocauda from the Middle Jurassic of China, and possibly Haldanodon from the Upper Jurassic of Portugal, were specialised for a semi-aquatic lifestyle. Castorocauda had a flattened tail and recurved molars, which suggests possible fish or aquatic invertebrate diet. It was thought possible that docodonts had tendencies towards semi-aquatic habits, given their presence in wetland environments, although this could also be explained by the ease with which these environments preserve fossils compared with more terrestrial ones. Recent discoveries of other complete docodontans such as the specialised digging species Docofossor, and specialised tree-dweller Agilodocodon suggest Docodonta were more ecologically diverse than previously suspected. Docofossor shows many of the same physical traits as the modern day golden mole, such as wide, shortened digits in the hands for digging.

Classification
The lineage of Docodonta evolved prior to the origin of living mammals: monotremes, marsupials, and placentals. In other words, docodonts are outside of the mammalian crown group, which only includes animals descended from the last common ancestor of living mammals. Previously, docodonts were sometimes regarded as belonging to Mammalia, owing to the complexity of their molars and the fact that they possess a dentary-squamosal jaw joint. However, modern authors usually limit the term "Mammalia" to the crown group, excluding earlier mammaliaforms like the docodonts. Nevertheless, docodonts are still closely related to crown-Mammalia, to a greater extent than many other early mammaliaform groups such as Morganucodonta and Sinoconodon. Some authors also consider docodonts to lie crownward of the order Haramiyida, though most others consider haramiyidans to be closer to mammals than docodonts are. Docodonts may lie crownward of haramiyidans in phylogenetic analyses based on maximum parsimony, but shift stemward relative to haramiyidans when the same data is put through a Bayesian analysis.

Cladogram based on a phylogenetic analysis of Zhou et al. (2019) focusing on a wide range of mammaliamorphs:

Docodont fossils have been recognized since the 1880s, but their relationships and diversity have only recently been well-established. Monographs by George Gaylord Simpson in the 1920s argued that they were specialized "pantotheres", part of a broad group ancestral to true therian mammals according to their complex molars. A 1956 paper by Bryan Patterson instead argued that docodont teeth were impossible to homologize with modern mammals. He drew comparisons to the teeth of Morganucodon and other "triconodont" mammaliaforms, which had fairly simple lower molars with a straight row of large cusps. However, re-evaluations of mammaliaform tooth homology in the late 1990s established that docodonts were not closely related to either morganucodonts or therians. Instead, they were found to be similar to certain early "symmetrodonts", a broad and polyphyletic grouping of mammaliaforms with triangular upper molars. In particular, the closest relatives of Docodonta have been identified as certain Late Triassic "symmetrodonts", such as Delsatia and Woutersia (from the Norian-Rhaetian of France) and Tikitherium (from the Carnian of India). These "symmetrodonts" have three major cusps (c, a, and b) set in a triangular arrangement on their lower molars. These cusps would be homologous to cusps c, a, and g in docodonts, which have a similar size and position. Tikitherium in particular is very similar to docodonts, as its wide upper molars have an apparent lingual cusp (cusp X) with a labial wear facet, though its cusp Y is comparatively underdeveloped. Cusp X is even more prominent in Woutersia, though it lacks a wear facet in that genus.

Unambiguous docodonts are restricted to the Northern Hemisphere, abruptly appearing in the fossil record in the Middle Jurassic. Very few docodonts survived into the Cretaceous Period; the youngest known members of the group are Sibirotherium and Khorotherium, from the Early Cretaceous of Siberia. One disputed docodont, Gondtherium, has been described from India, which was previously part of the Southern Hemisphere continent of Gondwana. However, this identification is not certain, and in recent analyses, Gondtherium falls outside the docodont family tree, albeit as a close relative to the group. Reigitherium, from the Late Cretaceous of Argentina, has previously been described as a docodont, though it is now considered a meridiolestidan mammal. Some authors have suggested splitting Docodonta into two families (Simpsonodontidae and Tegotheriidae), but the monophyly of these groups (in their widest form) are not found in any other analyses, and therefore not accepted by all mammal palaeontologists. 

Cladograms based on phylogenetic analyses focusing on docodont relationships:

 Topology of Zhou et al. (2019), based on tooth, cranial, and postcranial traits:

 Topology of Panciroli et al. (2021), based on dentary and tooth traits:

Subgroups and genera 
Superfamily †Docodontoidea
Family †Docodontidae (Marsh 1887) Simpson 1929
 †Agilodocodon scansorius Meng et al. 2015
 †Borealestes Waldman & Savage 1972 
 †B. cuillinensis Panciroli et al. 2021
 †B. serendipitus Waldman & Savage 1972
 †Castorocauda lutrasimilis Ji et al. 2006
 †Cyrtlatherium canei Freeman 1979 sensu Sigogneau-Russell 2001 (dubious) [Simpsonodon oxfordensis Kermack et al. 1987]
 †Dobunnodon mussettae [Borealestes mussetti] Sigogneau-Russell 2003 sensu Panciroli et al. 2021
 †Docodon Marsh 1881 [Dicrocynodon Marsh in Osborn, 1888; Diplocynodon Marsh 1880 non Pomel 1847; Ennacodon Marsh 1890; Enneodon Marsh 1887 non Prangner 1845]
 †D. apoxys Rougier et al. 2014
 †D. victor (Marsh 1880) [Dicrocynodon victor (Marsh 1880); Diplocynodon victor Marsh 1880]
 †D. striatus Marsh 1881 [disputed]
 †D. affinis (Marsh 1887) [Enneodon affinis Marsh 1887] [disputed]
 †D. crassus (Marsh 1887) [Enneodon crassus Marsh 1887; Ennacodon crassus (Marsh 1887)] [disputed]
 †D. superus Simpson 1929 [disputed]
 †Docofossor brachydactylus Luo et al. 2015
 †Dsungarodon zuoi Pfretzschner et al. 2005 [Acuodulodon Hu, Meng & Clark 2007; Acuodulodon sunae Hu, Meng & Clark 2007]
 †Gondtherium dattai Prasad & Manhas 2007 [disputed]
 †Haldanodon exspectatus Kühne & Krusat 1972 sensu Sigoneau-Russell 2003
 †Hutegotherium yaomingi Averianov et al. 2010
 †Itatodon tatarinovi Lopatin & Averianov 2005 [disputed, possibly a shuotheriid]
 †Khorotherium yakutensis Averianov et al. 2018
 †Krusatodon kirtlingtonensis Sigogneau-Russell 2003
 †Microdocodon gracilis Zhou et al. 2019
 †Paritatodon kermacki (Sigogneau-Russell, 1998) [disputed, possibly a shuotheriid]
 †Peraiocynodon Simpson 1928
 †P. inexpectatus Simpson 1928 [possible synonym of Docodon]
 †P. major Sigogneau-Russell 2003 [disputed]
 †Sibirotherium rossicus Maschenko, Lopatin & Voronkevich 2002
 †Simpsonodon Kermack et al. 1987
 †S. splendens (Kühne 1969)
 †S. sibiricus Averianov et al. 2010
 †Tashkumyrodon desideratus Martin & Averianov 2004
 †Tegotherium gubini Tatarinov 1994

See also
 Evolution of mammals

References

External links
Docodonta from Palaeos

 
Fossil taxa described in 1946
Middle Jurassic first appearances
Early Cretaceous extinctions
Taxa named by Miklós Kretzoi